Sarney-ye Ashub (also Romanized as Sarney-ye Āshūb) is a village in Hur Rural District, in the Central District of Faryab County, Kerman Province, Iran. At the 2006 census, its population was 547, in 127 families.

References 

Populated places in Faryab County